The Church of Saint John the Baptist is a Catholic church in Ein Karem, Jerusalem, that belongs to the Franciscan order. It was built at the site where Saint John the Baptist is believed to have been born.

In 1941–42 the Franciscans excavated the area west of the church and monastery. Here they discovered graves, rock-cut chambers, wine presses and small chapels with mosaic tiling. The southern rock-cut chamber contained ceramic datable to a period stretching from approximately the first century BC till 70 AD, an interval that includes the presumed lifetime of Zechariah, Elizabeth and John. The community living here has been dated by the archaeological findings back to the Roman, Byzantine and Early Muslim periods.

Most of the current church structure probably dates back to the 11th century, with the lower courses possibly dating to the Byzantine period (4th-7th century).

History

In 1941-42 the Franciscans excavated the area west of the church and monastery. Here they found Late Roman chambers and graves, and small Byzantine chapels and wine presses. The community living here has been dated by the archaeological findings back to the Roman, Byzantine and Early Muslim periods.

French archaeologist Abel (1878–1953) positioned that most of the current church probably dates back to the 11th century, with the lower courses possibly dating to the Byzantine period (4th-7th century).

Late Roman period
The digs west of the main buildings brought to light graves and rock-cut chambers. The southern rock-cut chamber contained ceramic datable to a period stretching from approximately the first century BC to 70 AD, an interval that includes the presumed lifetime of Zechariah, Elizabeth and John.

Byzantine period
The lower courses of the current church possibly date  to the Byzantine period (4th-7th century).

Early Muslim period
The church is mentioned in the Book of the Demonstration, attributed to Eutychius of Alexandria (940): "The church of Bayt Zakariya in the district of Aelia bears witness to the visit of Mary to her kinswoman Elizabeth."

According to French archaeologist Félix-Marie Abel, most of the current church probably dates back to the 11th century (the Fatimid period), with the lowest part of the walls possibly dating to the Byzantine period (4th-7th century).

Crusader period
A Russian pilgrim known as Abbot Daniel visited the village in 1106 and described here two churches. In the one identified by him as "the house of Zechariah .... where the holy Virgin came to greet Elizabeth", he mentions, on the left side, a "small cavern, in which John the Forerunner was born." The grotto seen in the current church at the front of the left aisle must be the same one mentioned by Daniel.

The Church of St. John, or of the Magnificat, is mentioned in 1113 AD in Ein Karem.

Mamluk period
In 1480 Felix Fabri reported it as tall, vaulted, and still painted, but turned into a stable for animals.

Ottoman period

17th century
The site of the Crusader church built above the traditional birth cave of St John, destroyed after the departure of the Crusaders, was purchased by Franciscan custos, Father Thomas of Novara in 1621. The Muslim inhabitants forced the Catholics to abandon the site a few times during the 17th century and used the grotto and buildings as stables, even after the Sultan issued a firman confirming Franciscan property over it in 1672, obtained through the influence of the Marquis de Nointel, the French Ambassador to the Ottoman Empire. Only in 1693 did the Franciscans return for good, rebuilt, and fortified the site.

In 1697 Henry Maundrell noted that: "The Convent of St John has been within these four years rebuilt from the ground. It is at present a large square building, uniform and neat all over; but that which is most eminently beautiful in it is its Church. It consists of three Isles, and has in the middle a handsome Cupola, under which is a pavement of mosaic, equal to, if not exceeding the finest works of the Ancients in that kind. At the upper end of the North Isle, you go down seven Marble steps, to a very splendid Altar, erected over the very place where they say the holy Baptist was Born. Here are Artificers still employed, in adding farther beauty and ornament to this Convent."

19th century
James Silk Buckingham visited in the early 1800s, and found the convent "appeared to be superior in comfort and arrangement to that of Jerusalem, and equal to that of Nazareth. The church is one of the most simply beautiful throughout the Holy Land. As the friars are all Spaniards, it partakes more of the style of that nation than any other, in its ornaments."

In 1883,  the PEF's Survey of Western Palestine (SWP)  noted: "The Church of the Baptist, in the village itself, is of Crusading origin; but the interior has been covered with encaustic tiles, and none of the older work is recognizable. The dome rises from four heavy piers; the grotto north of the high altar (at the east end of the church), is reached by seven steps; it is said to be the birthplace of St. John. A bad copy of a Murillo is hung on the north side of the church, and much prized by the monks, who are chiefly Spaniards".

British Mandate period
In 1941-42 the Franciscans excavated the area west of the church and monastery.

Design and construction of the upper level of the structure began in 1938, and was completed by Italian architect Antonio Barluzzi in 1939, preserving all extant Byzantine and Crusader remains as part of the new shrine..

Present church plan

Floor plan and legend:
1 (brown): Cave of John the Baptist's birth
2 (yellow): Crusader church (11th-12th century), representing the base of the current church
3 (red): Byzantine-period chapel with tombs and mosaic inscription mentioning martyrs (5th century)
4 (red): Byzantine-period chapel (7th century)
5 (brown): Jewish ritual bath or mikveh (1st century)
6 & 7 (green): Crusader halls (12th century)

Gallery

See also
 Church of the Visitation

References

Bibliography

External links
 St. John Ba Harim, at BibleWalks.com
 Ain Karem: Saint John the Baptist, at custodia.org
Photos of the Mosaic floor of the church at the Manar al-Athar photo archive

St. John the Baptist